Ian Gibbons (18 July 1952 – 1 August 2019) was an English keyboardist, most notable for playing with The Kinks.

Gibbons began playing the accordion at the age of nine, playing in the school band, and solo at music festivals, competitions and charity events. At the age of 14, he started a school rock band, playing guitar and singing. He changed to organ after leaving school and played in local and resident bands until 1972, when he joined Moonstone, which released three singles. Gibbons also worked with Love Affair, The Nashville Teens and various cover bands whilst recording another album for English Assassin, which was shelved. 

Punk and new wave came along and Gibbons worked with rock based and new wave bands until an audition for The Kinks in 1979. He was asked to join, and stayed with them until 1989, whilst also working with Dr. Feelgood, The Kursaal Flyers, Blues 'n Trouble, Ken Hensley, Mike Vernon, Samson, Randy California and others, mainly recording. He rejoined the Kinks again in 1993, staying with them until their break-up in 1997.

Gibbons worked with Roger Chapman, Sweet, Suzi Quatro and Ian Hunter (from 1989 onwards), before returning to The Kinks in 1993. He continued to record and perform with Chapman and Hunter, along with Chris Farlowe, Maggie Bell, Andy Scott, The Chicago Blues Brothers and, more recently, on Ray Davies choir and other projects. In 2008, he joined The Kast Off Kinks, a line-up which includes or has included former Kinks members Mick Avory, Jim Rodford, John Dalton and John Gosling, and former Tim Rose sideman, Dave Clarke.

Gibbons died on 1 August 2019 at home  at the age of 67 from bladder cancer.

Discography

The Kinks
 Give the People What They Want keyboard
 State of Confusion keyboard
 Word of Mouth keyboard, vocals (background)
 Think Visual keyboard, vocals (background)
 Live: The Road keyboard, vocals (background)

References

The Kinks members
English rock keyboardists
2019 deaths
Place of birth missing
20th-century English musicians
21st-century English musicians
1952 births
Deaths from bladder cancer
Deaths from cancer in England